Pyropelta wakefieldi is a species of sea snail, a marine gastropod mollusk in the family Pyropeltidae.

Distribution
This marine species occurs off the Juan de Fuca Ridge, NE Pacific

References

External links
 To World Register of Marine Species

Pyropeltidae
Gastropods described in 1992